CodeMirror is a JavaScript component that provides a code editor in the browser. It has a rich programming API and a focus on extensibility.

History 

The first version of the editor was written early 2007, for the console in the Eloquent JavaScript website. The code was first packaged up and released under the name CodeMirror in May 2007. This version was based on the contentEditable feature of browsers.

In late 2010, the Ace project, another JavaScript-based code editor, pioneered new implementation techniques and demonstrated that it is possible, even in JavaScript, to handle documents with many thousands of lines without degraded performance. This prompted a rewrite of CodeMirror  along the same principles. The result was version 2, which no longer relied on contentEditable and significantly improved performance.

See also 
 Comparison of JavaScript-based source code editors

References

External links 
 
 Blog series about CodeMirror internals

JavaScript libraries
JavaScript-based HTML editors
Software using the MIT license